Godard van Reede, 1st Earl of Athlone, Baron van Reede, Lord of Ginkel, born in the Netherlands as Baron Godard van Reede (14 June 1644 – 11 February 1703), was a Dutch general who rose to prominence during the Williamite War in Ireland.

Early career
In his youth he entered the Dutch cavalry as an officer, receiving his first commission at age 12. He served as a colonel and brigadier in the Franco-Dutch War. He fought at Seneffe, where he was gravely wounded. In 1675 van Reede was promoted to major-general and in 1683 to lieutenant-general.

In 1688, he accompanied William, Prince of Orange, in his expedition to England—the "Glorious Revolution" which deposed James II. The following year, Ginkel distinguished himself by a memorable exploit—the pursuit, defeat and capture of a Scottish regiment that had mutinied for James at Ipswich, and was marching northward across the Fens. It was the alarm excited by this mutiny that facilitated the passing of the first Mutiny Act. In 1690, Ginkel accompanied William III to Ireland to take on the Jacobites, and commanded a body of Dutch cavalry at the Battle of the Boyne. On the king's return to England, General Ginkel was entrusted with the conduct of the war in Ireland. (See also Williamite war in Ireland).

Williamite commander

He took command in Ireland in the spring of 1691, and established his headquarters at Mullingar. Among those who held a command under him was the Marquis of Ruvigny, the recognised chief of the Huguenot refugees. Early in June, Ginkel took the fortress of Ballymore, capturing the whole garrison of 1,000 men. The Williamites lost only eight men. After reconstructing the fortifications of Ballymore, the army marched to Athlone, then one of the most important of the fortified towns of Ireland and key to the Jacobite defensive position, as it bridged the River Shannon. The Irish defenders of the place were commanded by a distinguished French general, the Marquis de St Ruth. The firing began on 19 June, and on 30 June the town was stormed, the Irish army retreating towards Galway, and took up their next defensive position at Aughrim. Having strengthened the fortifications of Athlone and having left a garrison there, Ginkel led the combined Williamite forces, on 8 July, westward in pursuit of the retreating army and met the Jacobite force in formal battle on 12 July 1691 at Aughrim.

The subsequent battle all but decided the war in the Williamites' favour. An immediate attack was resolved on, and, after a severe and at one point doubtful contest, the Jacobite position was severely weakened by the death of their French commander Charles Chalmot de Saint-Ruhe, Marquis de Saint Ruth, after which his disorganised forces fled in the ensuing darkness of the early morning of 13 July. The battle was described as "quite possibly the bloodiest battle ever fought in the British Isles", with historians generally agreeing that roughly 5,000–7,000 men were killed during the battle; Ginkel recorded that 526 Jacobite prisoners of all ranks were captured. While Ginkel had promised Jacobite commander William Dorrington that all captives would be treated as prisoners of war, general officers were instead taken to the Tower of London as prisoners of state while the majority of the rank and file were imprisoned on Lambay Island where many died of disease and starvation.

Galway next capitulated, its garrison being permitted to retire to Limerick. There the viceroy Tyrconnell was in command of a large force, but his sudden death early in August left the command in the hands of General Patrick Sarsfield, 1st Earl of Lucan, and the Frenchman d'Usson. Led by Ginkel, the Williamites came in sight of the town on the day of Tyrconnell's death, and the bombardment and siege were immediately begun. Ginkel, by a bold device, crossed the River Shannon and captured the camp of the Irish cavalry. A few days later he stormed the fort on Thomond Bridge, and after difficult negotiations, a capitulation was signed—the Treaty of Limerick, the terms of which were divided into a civil and a military treaty.

Thus was completed the Williamite conquest of Ireland, and the services of the Dutch general were amply recognised and rewarded. Ginkell received the formal thanks of the House of Commons, and was created by the king 1st Earl of Athlone and baron of Aughrim. The immense forfeited estates of the Earl of Limerick were given to him, but the grant was a few years later revoked by the English Parliament.

Later life
The Earl of Athlone continued to serve in the English Army, and accompanied the king to the continent in 1693. He fought at the sieges of Namur in 1695 and the Battle of Neerwinden, and assisted in destroying the French magazine at Givet. In the War of the Spanish Succession, Lord Athlone succeeded the Prince of Nassau-Usingen in 1702 as first Field Marshal of the Dutch States Army, serving under the 1st Duke of Marlborough, the Allied commander-in-chief in the Low Countries.

Private life
Ginkel married Ursula Philipota van Raesvelt, heiress of Castle Middachten near Arnhem, and with her had several children.

He was succeeded, in 1703 upon his death, by his eldest son Frederick Christiaan van Reede, the 2nd earl (1668–1719), a distinguished soldier in the reigns of William III and Queen Anne and who had been naturalised as an English subject in 1696.

On the death of the 9th Earl of Athlone without issue in 1844, however, the title expired. It was, however, created again on two more occasions in 1890 and 1917.

See also
 List of people on stamps of Ireland
 Williamite War in Ireland

Notes

References

 

1630 births
1703 deaths
Barons of Reede
Ginkell, Godert De, 1st Earl of Athlone
Ginkell, Godert De, 1st Earl of Athlone
Ginkell, Godert De, 1st Earl of Athlone
Ginkell, Godert De, 1st Earl of Athlone
Earls in the Peerage of Ireland
Peers of Ireland created by William III
Ginkell, Godert De, 1st Earl of Athlone
Williamite military personnel of the Williamite War in Ireland
Dutch military personnel of the Nine Years' War
Dutch army commanders in the War of the Spanish Succession
17th-century Dutch military personnel
18th-century Dutch military personnel